James Alfred Miller, FSC (September 21, 1944 – February 13, 1982), also known as Brother Leo William or Santiago, was an American Catholic member of the Brothers of the Christian Schools.

Miller served as a teacher first in Cretin High School before being sent to teach in Bluefields in Nicaragua where he remained until his superiors ordered him to leave. He was requested to leave his work in Nicaragua due to political tensions that put Miller at risk of being killed, but he was frustrated to be sent back to his native home, where he remained for some time to teach. He was known for his construction and practical abilities to the point where students at Cretin High School referred to him as "Brother Fix-It." Miller was later sent to Guatemala where he taught, and he remained there until he was murdered. His killer was never identified and brought to justice, despite a long investigation.

Miller's beatification process opened in Huehuetenango on September 2, 2009 - though the cause's formal introduction came on December 15, 2009 - and Miller became titled as a Servant of God. Pope Francis approved Miller's beatification in late 2018. It was celebrated in Huehuetenango on 7 December 2019.

Life
James Alfred Miller was born premature on September 21, 1944, to farmers in Stevens Point, Wisconsin; his siblings included his brothers Bill and Ralph and sisters Pat Richter and Louise Shafranski. Miller l of weighed almost four pounds upon birth but later would stand at six feet two inches and weigh 220 pounds. He grew up in Custer. He was noted for having a boisterous laugh that could startle people in his adulthood.

Miller first attended grammar school in his area before he entered Pacelli High School in. It was while a freshman that he first met the De La Salle Brothers. In September 1959, he entered the juniorate in Missouri and was then admitted as a postulant into the order in 1962. He commenced his novitiate in August 1962, then assumed the habit and the religious name "Leo William." He would later resume using his baptismal name like some of his confreres. He received a master's degree in Spanish from Saint Mary's University of Minnesota in Winona. 

Miller first worked for three years as a teacher in Cretin High School, now called Cretin-Derham Hall High School (CDH), where he taught Spanish and English in addition to religious education. He also oversaw maintenance and coached football. Miller made his perpetual vows in August 1969.

In 1969, he was sent to Bluefields, Nicaragua, where he taught in schools until 1974 when he was sent to Puerto Cabezas and helped build an industrial arts and vocational complex. Under his leadership as director, the school at which he taught grew from 300 to 800 students. He also accepted the task of supervising the construction of ten new rural schools. However, his superiors later ordered him to leave Nicaragua in July 1979 due to the Sandinistas revolution that had broken out. This was exacerbated due to Miller's work with the Somoza government on education initiatives, which placed him at immediate risk of being a Sandinistas victim. Miller maintained distant ties to the Somoza government because he saw that as an excellent chance to have the government expand the schools according to his former classmate and confrere Francis Carr. But some residents took his cordial relations with the government as tacit support, which came to concern his superiors. This grew after Miller received threats to the point that the Sandinistas placed his name on a list of people to be "dealt with."

Miller was never to return to Nicaragua, which distressed him. When he returned to the United States, he taught once again at Cretin High School, now called Cretin-Derham Hall High School in St. Paul, Minnesota from 1979 to 1981. The students referred to him as "Brother Fix-It" as he dealt with maintenance issues and was often seen with a wrench in his hand. He also assisted students who had forgotten their locker combinations. In 1980, he participated in the Sangre De Cristo renewal program in Santa Fe, New Mexico. Miller was frustrated with his time back in his native home and wrote "I'm bored up here” and "I am anxious to return to Latin America."

He was transferred to Guatemala in January 1981, where he would remain for the remainder of his life teaching in a Lasallian Brothers school in Huehuetenango. He taught English, religion, and Guatemalan art to secondary level students. Miller devoted himself to providing job and leadership skills to the native Guatemalan Indians.

Three hooded and masked men shot and killed Miller during the afternoon on February 13, 1982. The latter was on a ladder repairing a wall at the De La Salle Indian School at Huehuetenango. Miller died at the scene before his body hit the ground. He had sent a student inside to get a tool to aid his work; several children witnessed the murder while watching Miller from a window. Unsuccessful attempts were made to find the assassins and the Guatemalan government expressed regret the case had dragged on for so long. The government later concluded that "subversive criminal elements" were perhaps responsible for the murder and closed the case. 

His funeral was celebrated in Guatemala and St. Paul before his remains were interred in the Polonia parish in Wisconsin.

Some claim his murder was in retaliation for the work of the order to prevent native males from being forcibly conscripted. Despite students being exempt from armed service, four men abducted a native student named Epifanio Camposeco to force him to enter the military after seizing him in the Huehuetenango marketplace on January 31, 1982. Lasallian Brother Paul Joslin went to the authorities to obtain the student's release between January 31 and February 11 but failed to do so despite the Brother’s adamant protests. Joslin later recalled that Miller came to his office in the morning, just hours before his murder, to inform him that he was going on a picnic with his class later that afternoon.
Miller's murder in Guatemala came during a string of priests and other religious figures being assassinated, such as Stanley Francis Rother (five months before Miller).

Beatification

The beatification process opened in Huehuetenango on September 2, 2009, in a diocesan process that later concluded in 2010. This diocesan investigation collected available documentation regarding Miller's life and a series of witness testimonies from those who knew Miller. But the formal introduction to the cause came on December 15, 2009, under Pope Benedict XVI after the Congregation for the Causes of Saints declared "nihil obstat" ("nothing against the cause") and titled Miller as a Servant of God. The C.C.S. later validated the diocesan process on July 9, 2010, in Rome while later receiving the Positio dossier for assessment.

Nine theologians that consult the C.C.S. issued unanimous approval to Miller's cause on March 20, 2018. Pope Francis confirmed Miller's beatification in a decree issued on November 7, 2018; the beatification was celebrated in Huehuetenango on December 7, 2019, with the bishop of David, Panama, Cardinal José Luis Lacunza Maestrojuán presiding. The current postulator for the cause is the De La Salle brother Rodolfo Cosimo Meoli.

Honors
The La Crosse diocese sponsors an annual Brother James Miller Social Justice Award. The "Brother James Miller Fund" was established after Miller's death and aimed to continue his work for the poor and oppressed.

References

External links
 Hagiography Circle
 Celebrating Our Brother James Miller, FSC
 Remembering Brother James Miller

1944 births
1982 deaths
20th-century American people
20th-century Roman Catholic martyrs
20th-century venerated Christians
Agriculture educators
American expatriates in Guatemala
American expatriates in Nicaragua
American people murdered abroad
American Roman Catholic missionaries
American venerated Catholics
Beatifications by Pope Francis
Beatified Roman Catholic religious brothers
Catholics from Wisconsin
Deaths by firearm in Guatemala
Educators from Wisconsin
Lasallian beatified people
People from Stevens Point, Wisconsin
People murdered in Guatemala
Roman Catholic missionaries in Guatemala
Roman Catholic missionaries in Nicaragua
Roman Catholic religious brothers
Saint Mary's University of Minnesota alumni
Venerated Catholics